The WWE Women's Championship was a women's professional wrestling championship in the World Wrestling Entertainment (WWE) promotion. The championship was generally contested in professional wrestling matches, in which participants execute scripted finishes rather than contend in direct competition. There have been a total of 30 recognized champions who have had a combined 59 official reigns. The title became vacant only twice in history for a total of 65 days and deactivated twice for a combined 1398 days. The following is a chronological list of wrestlers that have been WWE Women's Champion by ring name.

As recognized by the WWE, the inaugural champion was The Fabulous Moolah, who won the title on September 18, 1956, which at that time was the NWA World Women's Championship (which still exists today). While she was still champion, it became the WWF Women's Championship in 1984. In May 2002, after the WWF was renamed to WWE, the championship became the WWE Women's Championship. At the start of the brand extension that began in March 2002, the Women's Championship was defended on any brand until it became exclusive to Raw in September that year. It was the only women's championship in the WWE until SmackDown created the WWE Divas Championship as a counterpart title in July 2008. The titles switched brands in April 2009. On September 19, 2010, at Night of Champions, the Women's Championship was unified with the WWE Divas Championship, retiring the Women's Championship.

The Fabulous Moolah's third reign is the longest reign, and is officially recognized to be 10,170 days as part of her first reign, due to WWE not recognizing title changes between 1956 and 1984 (her first reign's real number is 3,651 days). Moolah technically also is tied with Trish Stratus for the most reigns at 7, but since the WWE does not recognize the title changes between 1956 and 1984, Moolah only has 4 reigns. Mickie James has the shortest reign with 1 hour. Wendi Richter is the youngest champion at the age of 22 years old, and Moolah is the oldest at the age of 76 years old. Bertha Faye is the heaviest champion and The Kat is the lightest champion. Chyna is the only undefeated champion. The final champion was Layla, in her first and only reign.

Four Women in history have held the championship for a continuous reign of one year (365 days) or more: The Fabulous Moolah (who achieved the feat on five separate occasions), Sensational Sherri, Rockin' Robin, and Trish Stratus.

Reigns

Names

Reigns

Combined reigns

See also
 Women in WWE
 NWA World Women's Championship
 List of former championships in WWE
 Women's championships in WWE

References

External links
 Official WWE Women's Championship Title History

WWE championships lists
WWE women's championships
Women's professional wrestling championships lists
Lists of women by occupation